The Mini Clubman is a subcompact executive car engineered and manufactured by BMW and sold under the Mini marque. The first-generation Clubman was introduced in 2007, as a variant of the Mini Hatch (Hardtop in the US). A commercial version called Clubvan was added to the range in 2012. The current second-generation model is produced since 2015 and available with front- and all-wheel drive.

History

The use of the name "Clubman" is a departure from Mini tradition. "Clubman" was originally the name given to the 1970s facelift of the classic Mini, which mostly resulted in a squared-off front end, whereas the classic Mini estates had traditionally been named "Traveller" or "Countryman". However, BMW did not initially purchase the rights to use those names, and so decided to call its larger-variant "Clubman", a name which it did own rights to.

Sketches of a new estate version of the Mini were shown at the 2000 Paris Motor Show, and a rendering of the estate concept (internally named EXT), wore the Clubman name on the licence plate. The Clubman started out in development based on the first generation Mini Hatch (R50) before changing to the second gen Hatch (R56).

First generation (R55) (2007–2014)

Design

The Clubman model weighs  more than its two-door counterpart.

The Clubman features access to its cargo space via bi-parting rear doors, known as barn doors or splitdoors. The passenger doors configuration and split rear cargo doors of the Clubman made it a unique model on the market at the time of release. Also, all Clubman models feature a single backwards opening side door to access the rear seats. The first generation was the first Mini to have suicide doors, but the second generation lacks them. It is marketed singularly as the Clubdoor, and is always located on its right side of the body – irrespective of market. It is much smaller in comparison to the regular driver and passenger side doors. This in turn creates differences between right and left-hand drive markets. In right-hand markets, the steering wheel won't allow the driver's seat from folding as far forward as the passenger seat. This means that left-hand drive markets feature increased access to the rear seat. For right-hand drive markets, including the car's home market, the bi-parting door is located on the road side of the car, requiring rear passengers to exit into the road.

The model variants are the same as the Hatch/Hardtop version; being in available in One, Cooper, Cooper D, Cooper SD, Cooper S and John Cooper Works (JCW) variations.

In 2011, the special edition Hampton was unveiled and comprised a Reef Blue metallic paint with a black roof, black leather seats, Damson Red bonnet stripes and interior detailing and Anthracite instruments borrowed from the Mini John Cooper Works.

In 2013, the company unveiled the Clubman Bond Street, named after a prestigious shopping destination in the West End of London, featuring exclusive and stylish appointments inside and out. The colour combination was Midnight black with Cool Champagne for the roof.

Specifications
Four-cylinder engine, automatic transmission and manual transmission selections are identical to those used in the corresponding hatchback models, except for the  One Diesel which is not offered in the Clubman. The rear suspension setup shares many of the same design features, including the rear trailing arms and the anti-roll bars.

In 2011 the Peugeot DV6 (Ford DLD-416) engine used in the diesel models was replaced with 1.6L BMW N47 engines. The 2.0L version of the BMW engine appeared for the first time in the range for the Cooper SD versions.

The Clubman comes with 6 airbags, stability control, brake assist driving, and electronic brakeforce distribution.

Cargo area

The cargo area of the first generation Clubman received mixed reviews. Although it was far bigger than the Mini Hatch, most critics still believed that it was too small in comparison to one of its main competitors, the Volkswagen Jetta SportWagen. Many complaints were also cited about the trunk. The majority of the car behind the B pillar was said to have created much road noise, especially at high speeds. Also, the rear seats did not fold flat with the load floor of the trunk. Critics also said that the "storage package", which included options such as a 12V power outlet, perimeter lighting, and nets, should have been a standard option on the vehicle.

Clubvan

The light commercial, panel van version of the Clubman was first shown to the public in June 2012, called the Clubvan. Initially shown as a concept car at the 2012 Geneva Motor Show,  a pre-production version was shown at the Goodwood Festival of Speed. Sales in the US began in early calendar 2013 but it was withdrawn in July with only 50 units sold, the Chicken tax having made it more expensive than a Clubman passenger wagon.

Second generation (F54) (2015–present)

A second generation Clubman was announced in 2013, with model code F54. A concept version was unveiled at the 2014 Geneva Motor Show, with the production model debuting at the 2015 Frankfurt IAA Motor Show.

The new model, based on the BMW UKL2 platform, features more space. It abandons the previous model's asymmetrical door layout for a standard four-door design, but it retains the rear barn doors.

Mini used many soft-touch plastics to cover the dash and majority of the door panels, real leather upholstery, and several upscale trim options.

Engines 
This generation of the Mini Clubman comes with two engines for the North American market. The basic model comes with the  1.5 liter 3-cylinder engine mated with either a 6-spd manual or 6-spd automatic transmission, while the new Mini Cooper S Clubman comes with a 2.0 liter 4-cylinder engine and 189 bhp, mated with either a 6-spd manual or 8-spd automatic transmission.

Clubman ALL4
This generation of the Clubman is the first to receive Mini's all wheel drive system, known as "ALL4". The system uses an electro-hydraulic system, which uses an electronically managed hydraulic pump to adjust the clutch sending power to the rear wheels. The system can then divert up to 50% of the engine’s power to the rear wheels, and the system actually defaults to AWD from the start, not FWD. Similar to BMW’s Xdrive system, which defaults to a 70/30 split rear to front and is able to divert 100% of power to the rear wheels, ALL4 starts at 50/50 and is able to re-allocate up to 100% of power back to the front wheels. Unlike one of its main competitors, the Volkswagen Golf Alltrack, the ALL4 version of the Clubman does not feature any raised suspension or rugged exterior design and body panels. Originally when it first arrived at dealerships, the Clubman was only available with ALL4 on the Cooper S model, but as of the 2017 model year, it is now available on the base Cooper model as well.

Vision GT Concept
In 2014, work began on the MINI Clubman VGT, which was designed for the videogame Gran Turismo 6. The car features four-wheel drive and carbon fibre components to save weight, and at nearly 400 horsepower, is one of the most powerful Minis. It was made available to players via an update in February 2015.

References

External links

Official website (United Kingdom)
Official website (United States)

Subcompact cars
Station wagons
Vans
Clubman
Front-wheel-drive vehicles
Retro-style automobiles
2010s cars
Cars introduced in 2007

fr:Mini Clubman